A piano bar is a venue where a pianist entertains.

Piano bar may also refer to:

 Piano Bar (Charly García album), 1984
 "Piano bar", the album's title track
 Piano Bar (Patricia Kaas album), 2002
 "Piano bar", a song by Engenheiros do Hawaii
 "Piano bar", a song by Francesco de Gregori from Rimmel
 "Piano-bar", a song by Françoise Hardy from L'Amour fou

See also